Aditesvarar Temple is a Siva temple in Peravur in Mayiladuthurai district in Tamil Nadu (India).

Vaippu Sthalam
It is one of the shrines of the Vaippu Sthalams sung by Tamil Saivite Nayanar Appar.

Presiding deity
The presiding deity is Aditesvarar. The Goddess is known as Gnanambikai.

Speciality
This was built by Aditya Chola and is known as Aditesvaram. Shrines of Vinayaka, Subramania, Gajalakshmi, and Chandikesvarar are found.

References

Hindu temples in Mayiladuthurai district
Shiva temples in Mayiladuthurai district